Alwar Junction railway station is a major railway station in Alwar district, Rajasthan. Its code is AWR. It serves Alwar city. The station consists of three  platforms. The platforms are well sheltered. It has many facilities including water and sanitation. Facilities including retiring room, and waiting room for passengers are also here .

Station is a major railway station on Delhi–Jaipur railway lines. The important station in Jaipur division of  North Western railway. The railway network connects Alwar with Delhi, Mumbai, Jaipur, Chandigarh, Ahmedabad, Jodhpur, Bikaner, Allahabad, and other important tourist cities of India.

References

Railway stations in Alwar district
Jaipur railway division
Transport in Alwar